Vidyut Sivaramakrishnan (born 3 December 1981) is an Indian cricketer. He is the son of cricketer Venkatraman Sivaramakrishnan (a left hand batsman who represented Tamil Nadu) and nephew of Venkatraman Ramnarayan (Who was an editor of Sruti magazine). Vidyut has a sibling named Nikhil. Vidyut is married to Sharanya Vidyut and has 2 kids and their names are Shakti and Aneesh. He lives in Chennai, India.

Career
Vidyut played for Tamil Nadu in the Ranji Trophy. He has also played for Chennai Super Kings in the Indian Premier League.

Vidyut was part of the 2000 Under-19 Cricket World Cup winning India national under-19 cricket team.

He last played in the IPL three years back. He was removed from the CSK squad when it was trimmed down. He last played a professional match in 2010. He is also the only number 11 batsman from India to score a first class century (100 runs).

External links
 Vidyut Sivaramakrishnan on cricinfo
 http://www.cricketnext.com/news/chennai-decide-to-bat/31299-13.html

Indian cricketers
Tamil Nadu cricketers
Chennai Super Kings cricketers
Haryana cricketers
Sebastianites Cricket and Athletic Club cricketers
Goa cricketers
South Zone cricketers
Living people
1981 births
Indian cricket coaches